The Council of Heads of State of the CIS, abbreviated in the Russian language as the SGG (СГГ), is a working body in the Commonwealth of Independent States. It serves as the supreme body of the CIS, and includes all the chief of state of CIS member states. Regular meetings of the council are held annually. It was created following the dissolution of the Soviet Union in 1991, directly replacing the State Council of the Soviet Union.  there are 9 members of the CIS: Armenia, Azerbaijan, Belarus, Kazakhstan, Kyrgyzstan, Moldova, Russia, Tajikistan, and Uzbekistan. Turkmenistan is an associate state of the CIS.

Activities 

The activities of the Council of Heads of State are governed by the agreement on the establishment of the Commonwealth of Independent States of 8 December 1991 and the CIS Charter of 22 January 1993. At its meetings, the Council of Heads of State make decisions concerning amendments to the CIS Charter, the creation or abolition of bodies of the CIS, and optimizing the structure of the CIS, among others. Decisions of the Council of Heads of State are taken by consensus, with any member state having the ability to declare its disinterest in a particular issue.

Current members

Chairmen 
The chairmanship of the council rotates every year to the leader of a member state. The chairman's host country gets to host the annual summit in their country (most likely their capital city). The chairmanship exists in accordance with regulations approved by the council in Dushanbe in October 2008. The following is a table of chairmen of the council.

Sessions

Early years 
The first meeting was held in the Belarusian capital of Minsk, where the Belovezha Accords were signed at Viskuli Government House. In the Kazakh capital of Alma Ata on 21 December, the Alma-Ata Protocol was signed, in which a provisional agreement on the membership and conduct of Councils of Heads of State and Government was concluded, as well as an agreement on Strategic Forces, Armed Forces and Border Troops. Many military documents were signed at a supplementary summit on 30 December in Minsk.

Later summits 

 1994
 Moscow (15 April)
Moscow (21 October)
 1995
 Alma-Ata (10 February)
 Minsk (26 May)
 1996
 January 19 - Moscow (19 January)
 Moscow (17 May)
 1997
 Moscow (28 March)
 Chisinau (23 October)
Moscow (29 April 1998)
 Moscow (2 April 1999)
 2000
 Moscow (25 January)
 Moscow (21 June)
 Minsk (1 December)
 2001
 Minsk (1 June)
 Moscow (30 November)
 Chisinau (7 October 2002)
 Yalta (19 September 2003)
 Astana (16 September 2004)
 Kazan (26 August 2005)
 Minsk (28 November 2006)
 Dushanbe (5 October 2007)
 Bishkek (10 October 2008)
 Chisinau (9 October 2009)
 Moscow (10 October and 10 December 2010)
 2011
 Dushanbe (3 September)
 Moscow (20 December)
 2012
 Moscow (15 May)
 Ashgabat (5 December)
 Minsk (25 October 2013)
 Minsk (10 October 2014)
 Burabay National Park (16 October 2015)
 Chong-Aryk, Bishkek (16 September 2016)
 Sochi (11 October 2017)
 Dushanbe (1 June 2018)
 Ashgabat (2019)
 Tashkent (2020)

See also 
 Commonwealth of Independent States
 List of G7 leaders

Notes 

Commonwealth of Independent States
Lists of politicians